Joseph Michael Schmondiuk, D.D. (August 6, 1912 - December 25, 1978), born in Wall, Pennsylvania, was an Archbishop of the Ukrainian Catholic Church. He is the first bishop of the church who was born in the United States.

On August 14, 1961, he was appointed Bishop of Stamford, succeeding Ambrose Senyshyn. On September 20, 1977, he was appointed Archbishop of Philadelphia.  He was succeeded by Basil H. Losten as Bishop of Stamford.  Schmondiuk was a Council Father of the Second Vatican Council.

External links
Catholic-Hierarchy
Diocese of Stamford, Connecticut

1912 births
1978 deaths
American people of Ukrainian descent
Bishops in Pennsylvania
Bishops in Connecticut
American Eastern Catholic bishops
Participants in the Second Vatican Council
20th-century American clergy
Eastern Catholic archeparchs in North America
Archbishops of the Ukrainian Greek Catholic Church